ERS Railways (formerly European Rail Shuttle B.V.) is a fully independent railway company, 100% owned by Freightliner Group Ltd., with five offices in four countries across Europe. With a modern fleet of locomotives and over 400 leased container platforms, low-bed as well as double pocket wagons, they are able to transport container, tank and trailer units. ERS Railways has so far been granted railway licenses in the Netherlands, Belgium, Germany and Austria.

History
European Rail Shuttle B.V. was founded in 1994 as a joint venture between the companies Sealand Service, P & O Containers, Nedlloyd and NS Cargo. These four companies were aiming to cooperate in order to take full advantage of the liberalization process in Europe which started the same year. Pretty soon after the start of the joint venture NS Cargo decided to step out being replaced by Mærsk Line joining the three other shipping lines. At the very first beginning European Rail Shuttle started offering container shuttles between Rotterdam and a couple of destinations along the Rhine river in Germany as well as Melzo terminal in Italy. During its first years of operation, European Rail Shuttle was "only" acting as an intermodal operator while still buying traction services from state owned railway companies. The added value the company offered at that time to its shareholders was based on organizing intermodal shuttle solutions based on gathering enough volumes from its shareholders and taking care about purchasing traction services from a few suppliers and controlling their performance.

In 2002 European Rail Shuttle changed its name into ERS Railways and the container shuttles were run with leased locomotives. With this strategic move ERS Railways positioned itself as a fully independent player by acquiring railway licenses in The Netherlands, Germany and Belgium.

With its shareholders having gained appetite for expansion within the European railway scene ERS Railways became a major shareholder in the company boxXpress.de (de) which had been launched in 2000.

In 2007 ERS Railways BV (at that time fully owned by Maersk Line) had leased 17 Class 66 diesel locomotives running on the long distance corridors. This set-up changed in the next few years as ERS Railways decided to start reducing the number of diesel locomotives and replace them with electric locomotives. Since December 2012 ERS Railways does not use the diesel locomotives for long-distance transports, using only electric locomotives to haul all its long-distance trains. ERS Railways is one of the first railway companies who have joined the Dutch-based VIVENS electricity consortium which will supply 100% -free electric energy by 2018. In August 2013 Freightliner Group announce the acquisition of leading European intermodal rail operator and railway undertaking ERS Railways B.V. from Maersk Line. On the 25th of June 2014 in honor of the second anniversary of the direct rail shuttle service Rotterdam – Poznan a festive event was organized at CLIP terminal in Swarzedz. This event was celebrated in the presence of king Willem-Alexander of the Netherlands and queen Maxima of the Netherlands.

Routes 
ERS Railways is offering the following routes at the moment:
 Lübeck - Ludwigshafen v.v. (6x per week)
 Bremerhaven - Augsburg v.v. (5x per week)
 Bremerhaven - Kornwestheim v.v. (5x per week)
 Bremerhaven - Mannheim v.v. (3x per week)
 Bremerhaven - Munich v.v. (5x per week)
 Bremerhaven - Nürnberg v.v. (5x per week)
 Bremerhaven - Ulm v.v (4x per week)
 Hamburg - Kornwestheim v.v. (5x per week)
 Hamburg - Munich v.v. (5x per week)
 Hamburg - Nürnberg v.v. (5x per week)
 Hamburg - Ulm v.v. (8x per week)

Terminals
 In Rotterdam the containers are loaded at the Rail Service Center Rotterdam Waalhaven and P&O Ferries Europoort.
 In Italy the containers are loaded at the Sogemar Terminal.
 In Poland the containers and the trailers are loaded at the CLIP Terminal.

References

External links
Website ERS Railways

Railway companies of the Netherlands
Logistics companies of the Netherlands
Rail freight transport in the Netherlands
Companies based in Rotterdam